Sylvester Gardner Hill was a colonel in the Union Army during the American Civil War. He served as a brigade commander during the Red River Campaign and Battle of Nashville where he was killed in action. He received a posthumous appointment as a brevet brigadier general.

Early life
Sylvester Hill was born in North Kingstown, Rhode Island but moved to Ohio in 1840. He settled in Cincinnati and was employed in the lumber business until 1849. Hill took part on the California Gold Rush but failed to achieve any profit there. He traveled back eastward and settled in Muscatine, Iowa.

Civil War
Hill was in Iowa when the Civil War began. Hill helped raise the 35th Iowa Volunteer Infantry Regiment, of which he was appointed Colonel on September 18, 1862. For the first several months of its existence the 35th Iowa was on garrison duty in Illinois and Kentucky until being ordered to join the Army of the Tennessee besieging Vicksburg. After the siege of Vicksburg, Colonel Hill assumed command of the 3rd Brigade, 1st Division, XVI Corps (Right Wing), a position he would maintain for much of the remainder of the war. Hill was wounded at the battles of Pleasant Hill and Yellow Bayou in 1864. He returned to regimental command at the Battle of Tupelo but was back in command of the 3rd Brigade during Price's Missouri Raid.

Battle of Nashville
Hill's final engagement came in December 1864 at the Battle of Nashville.  On the first day of the battle Hill led his brigade against the Confederates on Montgomery Hill and was killed instantly from artillery fire from Redoubt No. 2. He was posthumously given a brevet promotion to brigadier general for his service at Nashville.

Notes

References

 Eicher, John H., and David J. Eicher. Civil War High Commands. Stanford, CA: Stanford University Press, 2001. .
 Hunt, Roger D. and Jack R. Brown. Brevet Brigadier Generals in Blue. Gaithersburg, MD: Olde Soldier Books, Inc., 1990. .

1820 births
1864 deaths
Union Army colonels
People of Iowa in the American Civil War
Union military personnel killed in the American Civil War